Macrotarsipus is a genus of moths in the family Sesiidae.

Species
Macrotarsipus albipunctus  Hampson, [1893]
Macrotarsipus similis  Arita & Gorbunov, 1995
Macrotarsipus africanus (Beutenmüller, 1899)
Macrotarsipus lioscelis  Meyrick, 1935
Macrotarsipus microthyris  Hampson, 1919

References

Sesiidae